The winners and nominees of the César Award for Best Film (French: César du meilleur film).

Winners and nominees

1970s

1980s

1990s

2000s

2010s

2020s

See also
Lumières Award for Best Film
Louis Delluc Prize for Best Film
French Syndicate of Cinema Critics — Best French Film
Magritte Award for Best Film
European Film Award for Best Film
Academy Award for Best Picture
BAFTA Award for Best Film
David di Donatello for Best Film
Goya Award for Best Film
Sophia Award for Best Film

References

External links 
  
 César Award for Best Film at AlloCiné

Film
 
Awards for best film